The Proceedings of the Institution of Mechanical Engineers, Part O: Journal of Risk and Reliability is a quarterly peer-reviewed academic journal that covers risk analysis and reliability engineering, including engineering, mathematical modelling and statistical analysis. The journal was established in 2006 and is published by SAGE Publications on behalf of the Institution of Mechanical Engineers. According to the Journal Citation Reports, its 2013 impact factor is 0.775.

Abstracting and indexing 
The journal is abstracted and indexed in Scopus and the Science Citation Index Expanded.

References

External links 
 

Engineering journals
English-language journals
Institution of Mechanical Engineers academic journals
Publications established in 2006
Quarterly journals
Reliability engineering
SAGE Publishing academic journals